"I Fall Apart" is a song by American rapper and singer Post Malone. It was sent to rhythmic contemporary radio through Republic Records on October 17, 2017, as the sixth and final single from his debut studio album, Stoney (2016). Malone wrote the song with producer Illangelo alongside Billy Walsh. A viral performance was released on social media.

Background
"I Fall Apart" was included on Post Malone's 2016 album, Stoney, and never originally released as a single, but a live performance of the song on September 24, 2017, went viral. A video of the performance was posted by a fan on Twitter and has earned more than 200,000 likes. It was later uploaded on Facebook, and has tallied more than 7.9 million global views.

Chart performance
The song has peaked at number 16 on the Billboard Hot 100 as well as peaking at number 19 on the UK Singles Chart, making it Post Malone's highest-charting single from Stoney in the United Kingdom.

Charts

Weekly charts

Year-end charts

Decade-end charts

Certifications

Release history

References

2016 songs
2017 singles
Post Malone songs
Songs written by Illangelo
Song recordings produced by Illangelo
Republic Records singles
Songs written by Post Malone